Hakea ferruginea, commonly known as rusty hakea, is shrub in the family  Proteacea.  It has flat leaves and white to cream-coloured flowers from late winter to mid-summer and is endemic to Western Australia.

Description
The branchlets are hairy and the leaves are arranged alternately. It blooms from July to November and produces white-cream flowers. The solitary inflorescences contain 16 to 20 flowers with a cream-white perianth. The black to brown seeds within have a narrowly ovate or elliptic shape with a wing down one edge.

Taxonomy
Hakea ferruginea was first formally described by the botanist Robert Sweet in 1827 and the description was published in Flora Australasica. Hakea repanda R.Br. is a synonym.
The specific epithet is a Latin word meaning "rust-coloured" or "rusty", referring to the colour of new growth.

Distribution
Rusty hakea is found in a small area in the Wheatbelt and an area along the south coast of the Great Southern and Goldfields-Esperance regions of Western Australia where it grows in sandy, rocky loam or clay soils. The shrub is often part of mallee heath or open forest communities.

Conservation status
Hakea ferruginea is classified as "not threatened" by the Western Australian Government  Department of Parks and Wildlife.

References

ferruginea
Eudicots of Western Australia
Plants described in 1828